The Eastern Metropolitan Regional Council (EMRC) is a regional local government body in Perth, Western Australia. The EMRC is composed of five member councils – the Town of Bassendean, City of Bayswater, City of Kalamunda, Shire of Mundaring and City of Swan.

EMRC was constituted in November 1993 and while its original function was to provide large scale waste management and disposal services in Perth's eastern region, this has been extended to include urban and natural environmental services, waste management consultancy services, Sustainability programs and Circular Economy initiatives.

The EMRC also publishes various reports, strategies and information.

In partnership with its five member councils, the EMRC works to develop and implement suitable resource recovery solutions for Perth's eastern region.

References

External links 
 EMRC official website
 Waste Education official website
 EMRC Guide to community services and tourism in Perth's eastern region

Town of Bassendean
City of Bayswater
City of Kalamunda
Shire of Mundaring
City of Swan